Helpsters is an American educational children's television series created by Tim McKeon and produced by Sesame Workshop and Big Indie Pictures as an original series for Apple TV+, and premiered on November 1, 2019, coinciding with the launch of the service. A spin-off short series, titled Helpsters Help You!, was released on April 24, 2020, in order to provide children with supportive content during the COVID-19 pandemic.

The show was announced at Apple's "It's Showtime" presentation on March 25, 2019, by Sesame Street's Big Bird and series protagonist Cody.

In March 2021, Apple renewed Helpsters for a third season which premiered on May 27, 2022.

Premise 
A group of monsters known as the Helpsters work together to help solve the problems of customers who enter their shop through teamwork and problem solving. The series aims to teach children important skills for planning and following directions for the challenges they face, as well as introducing them to basic concepts in coding.

Cast and characters

Main 
 Stephanie D'Abruzzo as Cody – Cody is the enthusiastic leader of the Helpsters whose positive attitude never fails to rally everyone to action.
 Martin P. Robinson as Mr. Primm – Mr. Primm is the most sophisticated member of the Helpsters with a secret wild streak. Always willing to help, Mr. Primm gets hung up on doing things the correct way.
 Tim Lagasse as Scatter – Scatter is the youngest and most innocent member of the Helpsters. He can be scatterbrained at times, but also comes up with ideas by thinking outside the box.
 Ingrid Hansen as Heart – Heart is the Helpster with the biggest heart. Be careful which instructions you give Heart, because Heart will do exactly what you say.
 Jennifer Barnhart as Jackie – Jackie is the Helpsters’ closest friend who appears whenever they need an extra hand. She speaks in monster mumbles that only the Helpsters can understand.

The series features puppet characters designed and built by Monkey Boys Productions.

Episodes

Season 1 (2019-20)

Season 2 (2020-21)

Season 3 (2022)

Helpsters Help You (2020)

Reception

Accolades

References

External links
  – official site
 

2019 American television series debuts
2010s American children's comedy television series
2010s American musical comedy television series
2010s preschool education television series
2020s American children's comedy television series
2020s American musical comedy television series
2020s preschool education television series
American children's musical television series
American preschool education television series
American television shows featuring puppetry
Apple TV+ original programming
English-language television shows
Television series about monsters
Television series by Sesame Workshop